The Bulgarian Women's Hockey League is the national women's ice hockey league in Bulgaria.

2008 teams
 Ledeni iskri
 Slavia Sofia

Champions
2008: Slavia Sofia

References

Women's ice hockey leagues in Europe
Ice hockey
Women